Botryodiplodin is an antibiotic mycotoxin produced by Penicillium.

References

Mycotoxins
Lactols